Upper Nishin Lake is a lake located north of Lake Superior in Thunder Bay District, Ontario, Canada.

See also
Nishin Lake
List of lakes in Ontario

References
 National Resources Canada

Lakes of Thunder Bay District